The Most Honourable Order of the Crown of Johor (Malay: Darjah Mahkota Johor Yang Amat Mulia) is an Order of chivalry awarded by the Sultan of Johor. It was first instituted on July 31, 1886.

It is awarded in three classes:
Knight Grand Commander (Dato' Sri Paduka-S.P.M.J.),
Knight Commander (Dato' Paduka-D.P.M.J.) and
Companion (Setia-S.M.J.).

Male recipients of these royal awards, the  Dato' Sri Paduka Mahkota Johor (SPMJ) and the Dato' Paduka Mahkota Johor (DPMJ) are entitled to be addressed with the honorary title “Dato” (equivalent to ‘Sir’) and their female spouse “Datin” (equivalent to ‘Lady’). Female recipients are given the honorary title Datin Paduka (equivalent to 'Dame') but there is no accompanying title for their male spouse.

The Order of the Crown of Johor is the oldest royal order in the country, introduced some 30 years before any of the other Malaysian royal households introduced a similar order. The awards are bestowed based on three main criteria namely; loyalty, meticulous service and diligence.
Since these royal awards were first conferred  in 1886, only 712 individuals have been honoured, an average of only five honours per year making it reputedly the rarest and hence most prestigious ‘Datoship’ (or knighthood) to get in Malaysia. Awards are conferred at the sultan's discretion, in conjunction with the birthday of the Sultan of Johor. The annual Honours List is published in most mainstream Malaysian media and newspapers.

Notable recipients

Knight Grand Commander (S.P.M.J) 
Franz Ferdinand
 Jaafar Haji Muhammad
 Abdul Rahman Andak
 Abdul Rahman Mohamed Yassin (1941)
 Hassan Yunus (1959)
 Mohamed Noah Omar (1960)
 Suleiman Abdul Rahman (1960)
 Abdul Razak Hussein (1961)
 Ismail Abdul Rahman (1965)
 Aw Cheng Chye (1968)
 Hussein Onn
 Mustapha Harun (1970)
 Sulaiman Ninam Shah (1970)
 Sardon Jubir (1972)
 Abdul Kadir Yusuf (1973)
 Mohamed Rahmat (1975)
 Awang Hassan (1977)
 Mahathir Mohamad (1979)
 Lee Kuan Yew (1984)
 Edmund W. Barker (1984)
 Jaffar Hussein (1986)
 Leonardus Benyamin Moerdani (1986)
 Try Sutrisno 
 Tan Hiok Nee
 Toh Ah Boon
 Abdul Rahman Ya'kub
 Abdul Taib Mahmud
 Ibrahim Ismail
 Syed Nasir Ismail
 Musa Hitam
 Samy Vellu
 Goh Chok Tong (1991)
 Tan Hong Chiang (1973)
 Muhyiddin Yassin (1991)
 Syed Hamid Albar
Abdul Ghani Othman (2004)
 Ali Hamsa (2013)
 Noorainee Abdul Rahman (2013)
 Mohamed Khaled Nordin (2013)
 Mohammad Yusoff Al-Attas
 Osman Sapian (2018)
 Hasni Mohammad (2021)
 Lee Hsien Loong (2022)

Knight Commander (D.P.M.J) 
 Onn Jaafar (1940)
 Tan Cheng Lock (1949)
 Aw Cheng Chye (1963)
 Toh Ah Boon
 Syed Jaafar Albar
 T. Sachithanandan
 Hishammuddin Hussein
 Zeti Akhtar Aziz
 Wan Mokhtar Wan Ahmad
 Abdul Rahim Thamby Chik
 Shake (singer)
 Tan Hong Chiang

Companion (S.M.J.) 
 Wong Ah Fook
 Lim Ah Siang
 Abdul Ghani Othman
 Muhyiddin Yassin
 Sharifah Aini

See also 
 Orders, decorations, and medals of the Malaysian states and federal territories#Johor
 Orders, decorations, and medals of Johor
 Order of precedence in Johor
 List of post-nominal letters (Johor)

References

External links 
 World Medal Index, Decorations of Johor
 Colecciones Militares (Antonio Prieto Barrio), Decorations of Johor
 Coronation website of Sultan Ibrahim 

Johor, Crown, Order of the
Crown of Johor